The La Radieuse was a French automobile manufactured only in 1907.  A voiturette built at Bayeux by one M. E. Marie, it was shown at the 1907 Paris Salon.

References

Radieuse, La